The higher education system in India includes both private and public universities. Public universities are supported by the Government of India and the state governments, while private universities are mostly supported by various bodies and societies. Universities in India are recognized by the University Grants Commission (UGC), which draws its power from the University Grants Commission Act, 1956. In addition, 15 Professional Councils are established, controlling different aspects of accreditation and coordination.  Private universities in India are regulated under the UGC (Establishment and Maintenance of Standards in Private Universities) Regulations, 2003. Per the UGC act and these regulations, private universities are established by an act of a local legislative assembly and listed by the UGC in the Gazette upon receiving the act. As confirmed by ruling of the Supreme Court of India, recognition by the UGC is required for the university to operate. Also, per the 2003 regulations, the UGC sends committees to inspect the private universities and publishes their inspection report.

The UGC publishes and regularly updates the lists of private universities. , the UGC consolidated list of universities lists 430 private universities. The earliest date of notification is that of Sikkim Manipal University, 11 October 1995. Private universities were established in 26 of the 28 states of India and in none of the 8 union territories.

Section 12 (B) of the UGC Act of 1956 also grants the UGC the right to "allocate and disburse, out of the Fund of the Commission, grants to Universities..." As such, the UGC may declare a private university as "Included under 12(B) of the UGC Act, 1956". Updates to these declarations are done in meetings of the UGC and published in the minutes. The latest list, lists 25 private universities as included under 12(B).

Other types of universities regulated by the UGC include:
 Central universities, or Union universities are established by Act of Parliament and are under the purview of the Department of Higher Education in the Union Human Resource Development Ministry.
 State universities are run by the state government of each of the states and territories of India, and are usually established by a local legislative assembly act.
 Deemed university, or "Deemed-to-be-University", is a status of autonomy granted by the Department of Higher Education on the advice of the UGC, under Section 3 of UGC Act, 1956.

Apart from the above universities, other institutions are granted the permission to autonomously award degrees. These institutes do not affiliate colleges and are not officially called "universities" but "autonomous organizations" or "autonomous institutes". They fall under the administrative control of the Department of Higher Education. These organizations include the Indian Institutes of Technology, the National Institutes of Technology, the Indian Institutes of Science Education and Research, the Indian Institutes of Management, the Indian Institutes of Information Technology and other autonomous institutes.

Universities by state
The state with the most private universities in India is Gujarat, with 60. There are no private universities in the states Goa and Kerala, nor in any of the Union territories of India, except .

List of universities 

In the list below, the year of establishment is the year stated by the UGC as "Date of Notification". Cases where this year is different than the year stated by the university are noted. Differences in title are also noted, except minor typographical errors and "University of X"/"X University" differences. Inspection report data is from the lists of private universities per state and individual reports are sourced where available.

Andhra Pradesh 
There are six private universities in Andhra Pradesh.

Arunachal Pradesh 
There are eight private universities in Arunachal Pradesh.

Assam 
There are eight private universities in Assam, two of which were declared fit under Section 12 (B).

Bihar
There are seven private universities in Bihar.

Chhattisgarh 
There are 15 private universities in Chhattisgarh, two of which were declared fit under Section 12 (B).

Goa 
There is one private university in Goa.

Gujarat 
There are 60 private universities in Gujarat, one of which was declared fit under Section 12 (B).

Haryana 
There are 25 private universities in Haryana, two of which were declared fit under Section 12 (B).

Himachal Pradesh 
There are 17 private universities in Himachal Pradesh.

Jharkhand 
There are 16 private universities in Jharkhand.

Karnataka 
There are 25 private universities in Karnataka, one of which was declared fit under Section 12 (B).

Madhya Pradesh 
There are 41 private universities in Madhya Pradesh.

Maharashtra 
There are 22 private universities in Maharashtra, one of which was declared fit under Section 12 (B).

Manipur
There are five private universities in Manipur.

Meghalaya 
There are nine private universities in Meghalaya.

Mizoram 
There is one private university in Mizoram.

Nagaland 
There are four private universities in Nagaland.

Odisha 
There are eight private universities in Odisha, two of which were declared fit under Section 12 (B).

Punjab 

There are 18 private universities in Punjab, two of which were declared fit under Section 12 (B).

Rajasthan 
There are 52 private universities in Rajasthan, the largest number among all states, four of which were declared fit under Section 12 (B).

Sikkim 
There are eight private universities in Sikkim.

Tamil Nadu
There are four private universities in Tamil Nadu.

Telangana
There are five private universities in Telangana.

Tripura 
There is one private university in Tripura.

Uttar Pradesh 
There are 32 private universities in Uttar Pradesh, seven of which were declared fit under Section 12 (B).

Uttarakhand 
There are 21 private universities in Uttarakhand, one of which was declared fit under Section 12 (B).

West Bengal 
There are 11 private universities in West Bengal.

See also
List of autonomous higher education institutes in India
 List of universities in India
 List of central universities in India
 List of state universities in India
 List of deemed universities in India

Notes

References 

private universities
Private universities in India